Timothy Akwesi Abeyie (born 7 November 1982, Westminster, London) is a former British-born Ghanaian sprinter specialising in the 200 metres, who competes for Ghana.

He competed at the 2004 World Indoor Championships, the 2006 World Indoor Championships and the 2006 European Championships without reaching the final. He won a bronze medal in the 4x100 metres relay at the 2005 Summer Universiade.

His personal best time is 20.57 seconds, achieved in July 2008 at Eton, Berkshire.

Formerly representing Great Britain, and Wales at Commonwealth level competitions, since June 2011, Abeyie has been cleared to represent Ghana.

Abeyie recorded a positive response to an in-competition drugs test whilst competing in Kaiserslautern, Germany, on 4 July 2015. He was handed a four-year ban from competition on 12 December 2016, which has been retroactively applied. His ban is from 17 July 2015 to 16 July 2019.

References

External links

1982 births
Living people
Welsh male sprinters
Ghanaian male sprinters
Athletes (track and field) at the 2014 Commonwealth Games
Commonwealth Games competitors for Ghana
Universiade medalists in athletics (track and field)
Universiade medalists for Ghana
Universiade bronze medalists for Great Britain